Black mangrove may refer to the plants:

 Aegiceras corniculatum (Primulaceae) - south-east Asia and Australasia
 Avicennia germinans (Acanthaceae) -  tropical and subtropical regions of the Americas, on both the Atlantic and Pacific coasts, and on the Atlantic coast of tropical Africa
 Bruguiera gymnorhiza (Rhizophoraceae) - tropical and subtropical coasts of eastern Africa, Indian Ocean, Asia, Australasia and western Pacific
 Lumnitzera spp. (Combretaceae) - eastern Africa, Asia, Australasia and western Pacific